Porcupine Ridge is a prominent mountain ridge located in the Goat Haunt area of Glacier National Park, in Glacier County of the U.S. state of Montana. This mountain is part of the Livingston Range, and is situated 1.5 mile east of the Continental Divide. Precipitation runoff from the mountain drains to the Waterton River via Olson and Valentine Creeks. This geographical feature's name was officially adopted in 1911 by the United States Board on Geographic Names.

Climate

Based on the Köppen climate classification, Porcupine Ridge is located in an alpine subarctic climate zone characterized by long, usually very cold winters, and short, cool to mild summers. Temperatures can drop below −10 °F with wind chill factors below −30 °F. This climate supports the remnant of an unnamed glacier on the northeast aspect below the summit.

Geology

Like the mountains in Glacier National Park, Porcupine Ridge is composed of sedimentary rock laid down during the Precambrian to Jurassic periods.

Gallery

See also
 List of mountains and mountain ranges of Glacier National Park (U.S.)
 Geology of the Rocky Mountains

References

External links
 Weather forecast: Porcupine Ridge
 National Park Service web site: Glacier National Park
 Porcupine Ridge fire lookout (photo): Flickr

Livingston Range
Mountains of Glacier County, Montana
Mountains of Glacier National Park (U.S.)
Mountains of Montana
North American 2000 m summits